Sébastien Gerard Pineau Flores (born 20 January 2003) is a professional footballer who plays as a forward for Austin FC II. Born in Chile, he is a youth international for Peru.

Club career
Having spent the 2021 season on loan with Universidad César Vallejo, Pineau returned to Alianza Lima for 2022, making his debut in a 2–0 win over Cienciano. With his contract at Alianza ending on 31 October 2022, he was left a free agent, stating that he would wait until after the 2023 South American U-20 Championship had concluded to negotiate a renewal with the club.

On 23 February 2023, Austin FC II announced they had signed Pineau to a two year contract through the 2024 season.

International career
Born in Santiago, Chile, to a Peruvian mother and French father, Pineau initially opted to represent his nation of birth, Chile, at international level, making his debut in December 2021.

In May 2022, he played in a friendly game for the Chile under-20 team against Uruguay, before being called up to represent both Chile and Peru in August of the same year. In November 2022, he switched allegiance to Peru, reportedly due to family influence, stating that he "always wanted to compete".

He was called up to the Peru squad for the 2023 South American U-20 Championship.

Career statistics

Club

References

2003 births
Living people
Footballers from Santiago
Peruvian footballers
Peru youth international footballers
Chilean footballers
Chile youth international footballers
Peruvian people of French descent
Chilean people of French descent
Chilean people of Peruvian descent
Association football forwards
Peruvian Primera División players
Club Alianza Lima footballers
Club Deportivo Universidad César Vallejo footballers
Austin FC players
Peruvian expatriate footballers
Chilean expatriate footballers
Peruvian expatriate sportspeople in the United States
Chilean expatriate sportspeople in the United States
Expatriate soccer players in the United States